Gun Runner is a 1949 American Western film directed by Lambert Hillyer and written by J. Benton Cheney. The film stars Jimmy Wakely, Dub Taylor, Noel Neill, Mae Clarke, Kenne Duncan and Marshall Reed. The film was released on January 30, 1949, by Monogram Pictures.

Plot

Cast          
Jimmy Wakely as Jimmy Wakely
Dub Taylor as Cannonball 
Noel Neill as Jessica Harris
Mae Clarke as Kate Diamond
Kenne Duncan as Nebraska
Marshall Reed as Riley
Steve Clark as Sheriff Ted Harris
Ted Adams as Danny Fox
Bud Osborne as Burt
Carol Henry as Stacey
Bob Woodward as Sam

References

External links
 

1949 films
American Western (genre) films
1949 Western (genre) films
Monogram Pictures films
Films directed by Lambert Hillyer
American black-and-white films
1940s English-language films
1940s American films